Trombidiidae, also known as red velvet mites, true velvet mites, or rain bugs, are small arachnids (eight-legged arthropods) found in plant litter and are known for their bright red color.

Their life pattern is in stages similar to other members of the Prostigmata: egg, pre-larva, larva, protonymph, deutonymph, tritonymph and adult (male or female). They usually have only one breeding cycle per year.

They are active predators as grown adults. As early instars they are often parasites of insects and other arachnids.

One well-known species from Europe, Asia, and North Africa is Trombidium holosericeum. The systematics of this group has been in flux and many former subfamilies of this are now raised to families within the Trombidioidea.

List of genera 
According to Joanna Makol
 Trombidiinae Leach, 1815
 Allothrombium Berlese, 1903 synonyme Corethrothrombium Oudemans, 1928 & Mongolothrombium Feider, 1973
 Andinothrombium Makol, 2007 
 Andrethrombium Makol, 2007 
 Arknotrombium Haitlinger, 2007
 Azaritrombium Saboori, Bagheri & Haddad, 2005 
 Caenothrombium Oudemans, 1927
 Calctrombidium Haitlinger, 2003
 Clinotrombium Southcott, 1986
 Darjeelingia Makol, 2007 
 Dinothrombium Oudemans, 1910
 Dolichothrombidium Feider, 1945
 Iranitrombium Saboori & Hajiqanbar in Saboori, Hajiqanbar & Irani-nejad 2003
 Mesothrobium Hirst, 1926 synonyme Austrothrombium Womersley, 1934
 Monotrombium Zhang in Zhang & Norbakhsh 1995
 Oskootrombium Saboori, Bagheri & Haddad 2006 
 Paratrombium Bruyant, 1910
 Pollicotrombium Southcott, 1986
 Robauxthrombium Makol, 2007 
 Ronaldothrombium Makol, 2007 
 Trombidium Fabricius, 1775 synonyme Kaszabothrombium Fieder, 1973
 Variathrombium Robaux, 1969
 Wohltmannella Makol, 2007
 Xenothrombium Oudemans, 1927

Human use

The oil from the red velvet mite Trombidium grandissimum is used in traditional Indian medicine to treat paralysis.

References

 
Acari families